The following highways are numbered 730:

Costa Rica
 National Route 730

United States